Hațeg Island was a large offshore island in the Tethys Sea which existed during the Late Cretaceous period, probably from the Cenomanian to the Maastrichtian ages. It was situated in an area corresponding to the region around modern-day Hațeg, Hunedoara County, Romania. Maastrichtian fossils of small-sized dinosaurs have been found in the island's rocks.
It was formed mainly by tectonic uplift during the early Alpine orogeny, caused by the collision of the African and Eurasian plates towards the end of the Cretaceous. There is no real present-day analog, but overall, the island of Hainan (off the coast of China) is perhaps closest as regards climate, geology and topography, though still not a particularly good match. The vegetation, for example, was of course entirely distinct from today, as was the fauna.

The Hungarian paleontologist Franz Nopcsa theorized that "limited resources" found on the island commonly have an effect of "reducing the size of animals" over the generations, producing a localized form of dwarfism. Nopcsa's theory of insular dwarfism—also known as the island rule—is today widely accepted.

Geography
While a variety of estimates regarding the prehistoric island's size have been given over the years, the most reliable estimate places it at roughly  during the Maastrichtian, or about the size of the modern island of Hispaniola. It was positioned just within the equatorial belt, at about 27°N latitude.

Hațeg Island was probably located at least  from the nearest land mass. To the northwest was an island corresponding to the Bohemian Massif, to the southeast was an island corresponding to the Balkan–Rhodope Massif (including the modern Rhodope Mountains region), and to the west was a large island corresponding to part of the modern Iberian land mass. The closest continental land mass were portions of the Austro-Alpine region to the west and the Adriatic region to the south.

Hațeg Island itself was surrounded primarily by a deep marine basin, unlike some of the surrounding islands and land masses which were surrounded by shallow seas.

Climate and ecology
The island experience marked rainy and dry seasons, but despite this, the plant life on the island was mainly tropical in nature. Carbon isotopes indicate "dry woodland" conditions. This seeming contradiction between the seasonally dry climate and tropical plant species can be explained by the fact that tropical plants can thrive in a seasonally monsoonal environment today as long as they have access to sufficient amounts of water year-round, and the Hațeg environment seems to have been dominated by braided rivers and lakes. Early rock layers are dominated by volcanic deposits, but these are absent in higher layers, indicating that volcanic activity dropped off during this time.

Paleofauna

 
About nine species of dinosaurs, and several species of pterosaur are thought to have been indigenous to the island. These insular reptiles differed from their continental relatives due to island syndrome, which describes the differences in morphology, ecology and physiology seen in insular species compared to their continental relatives. Many taxa exhibit island dwarfism, becoming much smaller than their mainland relatives. For example the titanosaur, Magyarosaurus dacus, had a body mass of only  while mainland titanosaurs like Patagotitan could reach . Conversely, Hatzegopteryx exhibited island gigantism, becoming one of the largest pterosaurs ever to have lived. Similar to how extant bird species exhibit reduced wing size and reduced capacity for flight, Balaur bondoc appears to have secondarily lost its capacity for flight. Balaur is currently believed to be a basal avialan based on recent phylogenetic analyses, however, it was originally proposed to be a member of the avialan sister taxon, Deinonychosauria, based on its limb morphology. Its forelimbs were shorter and stockier than those of Avialae and so visibly incapable of powered flight, which led to this originally incorrect placement within the phylogeny. Mammals are almost exclusively represented by the endemic kogaionid multituberculates, an endemic group that evolved in the island's isolation and developed unique insectivorous habits, as well as a single eutherian remain. Remains of an indeterminate dromaeosaurid have also been found. Among these animals are included:
Allodaposuchus precedens, an eusuchian
Sabresuchus sympiestodon, a paralligatorid
Barbatodon, a genus of multituberculate represented by at least three species
Kogaionon ungureanui, a multituberculate
Litovoi tholocephalos, a dome-headed multituberculate
Hatzegopteryx thambema, an azhdarchid
Rhabdodon priscus, a rhabdodontid
Zalmoxes robustus, a rhabdodontid
Transylvanosaurus platycephalus, a rhabdodontid
Telmatosaurus transylvanicus, a hadrosaur
Struthiosaurus transylvanicus, a struthiosaurin nodosaur
Magyarosaurus dacus, a titanosaur (either a saltasaurid or a nemegtosaurid)
Paludititan nalatzensis, a titanosaur
Elopteryx nopcsai, an elopterygine troodont
"Megalosaurus hungaricus", an indeterminate theropod
Balaur bondoc, originally described as a dromaeosaurid but now believed to be an early example of insular flightless bird
Bradycneme draculae, an alvarezsaurid
Eurazhdarcho langendorfensis, an azhdarchid
Albadraco tharmisensis, an azhdarchid
A new recently found genus from the family azhdarchidae is also found, but has no name yet.
Aprosuchus ghirai, a late surviving atoposaurid crocodyliform

Constituent formations 
The Hațeg Island record is preserved as a number of formations, dating from the late Campanian to the Maastrichtian. These include:

 Sânpetru Formation
 Densus Ciula Formation
Sebeș Formation
 Sard Formation
Jibou Formation

See also 

 Hațeg Country Dinosaurs Geopark
 Dinosaurs of Romania
 Franz Nopcsa
 Insular dwarfism

References

External links 

 Late Cretaceous Animals of Romania's Haţeg Island--a More Complex View

Cretaceous islands of Europe
Cretaceous paleontological sites of Europe
Former islands
Geology of the Alps
Prehistory of Romania
Islands of Romania
Geology of Romania